Abibatou Traoré (born 1973) is a Senegalese writer and a member of the "Eminent Minds" panel created by Secretary General Kofi Annan. This panel was created to make suggestions for the fundamental reformation of the United Nations as an institution.

Works
 Sidagamie Présence Africaine Éditions, 1998. 
 Samba le fou L'Harmattan, 2006. 
 L'homme de la maison, Présence africaine, 2022.

References

20th-century Senegalese writers
1973 births
Living people
Senegalese officials of the United Nations
United Nations reform
21st-century Senegalese writers